Teleiodes bradleyi is a moth of the family Gelechiidae. It is found in Korea.

The wingspan is 13–14 mm. The forewings are clothed with greyish brown scales and scattered fuscous scale tufts.

References

Moths described in 1992
Teleiodes